Waghunde Bk is a village in Parner taluka in Ahmednagar district of state of Maharashtra, India.

Religion
The majority of the population in the village is Hindu.

Economy
The majority of the population has farming as their primary occupation.

New industrial area
Maharashtra Industrial Development Corporation launches a Supa-Waghunde Industrial Area which is additional to Supa Industrial area. This Supa-Waghunde Industrial area acquires 420 hector land for industries.

See also
 Parner taluka
 Villages in Parner taluka

References 

Villages in Parner taluka
Villages in Ahmednagar district
Industrial parks in India